Theo Sankofa is a fictional character from the long-running Channel 4 soap opera Hollyoaks, played by Andrew Somerville from 2001 to 2002.

Character creation
Andrew Somerville was cast in the Hollyoaks: On the Pull campaign to find new young actors to appear in the show. The other three chosen were Marcus Patric (Ben Davies), Lesley Johnston (Laura Burns) and Elize du Toit (Izzy Cornwell).

Storylines
Theo moved to Hollyoaks where he set up the village's first gadget shop Theologic, which supplied some of the strangest devices. Friendly and well-liked, Theo was someone who the residents of Hollyoaks came to for advice and help. He often supported and advised his friends, including Chloe Bruce (Mikyla Dodd) and Matt Musgrove. Theo also played a key part in helping Gordon Cunningham in winning the local elections as Theo was his right-hand man campaigner. In 2002, his younger brother Norman arrived and extra responsibility was put on Theo's shoulders, especially when his business began to fall apart.

Theologic wasn't making much profit, which led Theo into selling the business and both he and Norman had to move into the Hunter's caravan park. With crippling debts ahead and not much money available, Theo was struggling with money problems. Theo, along with Ben Davies, Kristian Hargreaves, Max Cunningham (Matt Littler), Jamie Nash and Sam "O.B." O'Brien (Darren Jeffries), headed for a potholing trip which turned into a disaster. During a rock fall, Theo died in the van the group was using, which left Sally Hunter to break the devastating news to Norman.

References

Hollyoaks characters
Television characters introduced in 2001
Male characters in television